Pa Tau Kwu is an area of Tsing Chau Tsai Peninsula, on Lantau Island in Hong Kong and the site of a former village. Administratively, it is part of Tsuen Wan District.

Administration
Pa Tau Kwu is a recognized village under the New Territories Small House Policy.

Geography
Pa Tau Kwu is located in the northeastern part of Lantau Island, northeast of Penny's Bay. The area includes two bays: Pa Tau Kwu Pak Wan and Pa Tau Kwu Nam Wan, separated by a small peninsula.

Archaeology
Pa Tau Kwu has been listed as a Site of Archaeological Interest and archaeological  excavations have been conducted in the area. The site is a headland site with coast on three sides that included the possible remains of  up to twenty houses.

References

External links
 Delineation of area of existing village Chok Ko Wan and Pa Tau Kwu (Ma Wan) for election of resident representative (2019 to 2022)

Lantau Island
Tsuen Wan District
Bays of Hong Kong